Artur Yusupov (Russian: Артур Юсупов, born 20 December 1983) is a Russian wheelchair fencer. He won a gold medal in the team épée event at the 2020 Summer Paralympics and placed fifth individually. Between 2011 and 2019 he won two gold, four silver and seven bronze medals in épée and foil events at the world championships.

Yusupov lost his leg in 1999. He first trained in sitting volleyball, before changing to wheelchair fencing in 2002. He is married to Ekaterina Yusupova; they have three daughters: Elizaveta, Eseniya and Eva.

References

External links 
 

Living people
1983 births
Russian male fencers
Wheelchair fencers at the 2020 Summer Paralympics
Medalists at the 2020 Summer Paralympics
Paralympic gold medalists for the Russian Paralympic Committee athletes
Paralympic medalists in wheelchair fencing
Paralympic wheelchair fencers of Russia
21st-century Russian people